Copablepharon viridisparsa is a moth of the family Noctuidae first described by F. H. Wolley Dod in 1916. It is found from southern California and southern Utah north to southern British Columbia, central Saskatchewan and south-western Manitoba.

The wingspan is 38–42 mm. Adults are on wing from June to August depending on the location.

The moths emerge from the pupae with the eggs nearly fully developed, and they are laid within a week or two. Eggs are laid in loose soil in mid-summer, and the larvae hibernate when partly grown, completing development the following spring. The larvae can bury themselves very rapidly if uncovered. They feed above ground at night and bury themselves about 2.5 cm deep in the soil under the host plants during the day.

Pupation occurs in an earthen cell about 5 cm deep in the soil. Adults emerge after three to four weeks.

Subspecies
 Copablepharon viridisparsa viridisparsa Dod, 1916
 Copablepharon viridisparsa hopfingeri (Franclemont, 1954)
 Copablepharon viridisparsa gilvum Crabo & Lafontaine, 2004
 Copablepharon viridisparsa ravum Crabo & Lafontaine, 2004

References

External links

Noctuinae
Moths of North America